The 1991 Volkswagen Cup was a women's tennis tournament played on indoor carpet courts at the Fairhall in Leipzig in Germany that was part of Tier III of the 1991 WTA Tour. It was the second edition of the tournament and was held from 30 September until 6 October 1991. First-seeded Steffi Graf won the singles title, her second consecutive at the event, and earned $45,000 first-prize money as well as 240 ranking points.

Finals

Singles
 Steffi Graf defeated  Jana Novotná 6–3, 6–3
 It was Graf's 5th singles title of the year and the 59th of her career.

Doubles
 Manon Bollegraf /  Isabelle Demongeot defeated  Jill Hetherington /  Kathy Rinaldi 6–4, 6–3
 It was Bollegraf's 1st doubles title of the year and the 8th of her career. It was Demongeot's 2nd doubles title of the year and the 6th of her career.

References

External links
 ITF tournament edition details
 Tournament draws

Sparkassen Cup
Volkswagen Cup
Volkswagen Cup
Sparkassen Cup (tennis)
Volkswagen Cup